Lily of the Valley (foaled 2 February 2007) is a French Thoroughbred racehorse who won the Prix de l'Opéra in 2010.

Background
Lily Of The Valley was bred in France by Dunmore Stud, Ltd. She is owned by Bernard Barsi, and is out of the Pennekamp mare, Pennegale.

Race record

Pedigree

References

2007 racehorse births
Thoroughbred family 4-r
Racehorses bred in France
Racehorses trained in France